= Wildlife Diary =

Wildlife Diary is a 26 episode documentary series broadcast on the South African Broadcasting Corporation. Billed as "the ultimate in reality TV", the series used 24-hour cameras filming a nature reserve in the African bush, tracking the life and death of a handful of animals.

== Main characters ==
- Roelani - a male leopard whose quest goes way beyond that of survival. He longs for female company.
- Felix and Zero - two powerful male African lions who are masters of hunting. It is thought one died during a fight with a rhinoceros, but his body was never found.
- Alph and Biggles - two African wild dogs that are locked in a struggle for dominance
- Flippy - a delinquent male African elephant who has rebelled against elephant ways; he is insecure and aggressive
- Koba and Shunga - two male cheetahs who share everything, including their females
- Tiya - a teenage spotted hyena with royal blood as she has inherited her mother's dominant status
- Maggie and Lisa - sister lionesses that suffer great hardship and tragedy while raising their cubs
- Melissa - a female cheetah who has failed in every attempt to raise a litter as she is too slight to fend for them
- Tiny - the first rhinoceros to appear in the series.
